Charles Clement Fussell (born February 14, 1938, in Winston-Salem, North Carolina) is an American composer and conductor of contemporary classical music.  He has composed six symphonies and three operas.  His symphony Wilde for solo baritone and orchestra, based on the life of Oscar Wilde and premiered by the Newton Symphony Orchestra and the baritone Sanford Sylvan in 1990, was a finalist for the 1991 Pulitzer Prize for Music. He received a citation and award from the American Academy of Arts and Letters in 1992.

Fussell received advanced degrees in composition and conducting from the Eastman School of Music, where he studied with Thomas Canning and Bernard Rogers.  He received a Fulbright grant to study at the Berlin Hochschule für Musik, where he worked with Boris Blacher.  He also attended the Bayreuth masterclasses of Friedelind Wagner. In 1964 he received a Ford Foundation grant to be a composer-in-residence in the Newton, Massachusetts public school system. He was an assistant and close friend of the composer Virgil Thomson. He served as the president of the Thomson Foundation for many years.

Fussell has served on the faculty of the University of Massachusetts at Amherst, the North Carolina School of the Arts (1976–1977), Boston University (1983–2003), and Rutgers University.

Catalogue of works 
Late 1950s

 Essay for Orchestra
 Variations for Orchestra
 Six Dances for Orchestra

1962

 Caligula, opera based on a play by Albert Camus
 Trio, for violin, cello, and piano

1963

 Dance Suite, for flute, trumpet, viola, and two percussionists
 Symphony in One Movement [No. I], for large orchestra

1964

 Sweelinck Liedvariationen Mein Junges Leben, for solo string trio, marimba, mandolin, harp, and small orchestra
 Saint Stephen and Herod, drama for speaker, chorus, and winds

1965

 Poems for Chamber Orchestra and Voices after Hart Crane, text by Hart Crane
 Three Choral Pieces (rev. 1975), for chorus and piano
 I. Fancy's Knell (SA and piano)
 II. Three Epitaphs (TB and piano)
 III. I Saw a Peacock (mixed chorus and piano)

1967

 Symphony No. II, for soprano and large orchestra

1968

 Two Ballades (rev. 1976), for cello and piano
 The Blessed Virgin's Expostulation, realization after Henry Purcell for soprano and ten instruments

1970

 Voyages, for soprano and tenor soloists, female chorus, piano, and solo wind instrument plus recorded speaker. Text by Hart Crane.

1971

 Julian, drama in five scenes after the tale of Gustave Flaubert

1973

 Three Processionals for Orchestra

1975

 Eurydice, for soprano, flute, clarinet, violin, cello, and piano, with obligato trumpet, horn, trombone, and bass-drum

1976

 Résumé, cycle of nine songs for soprano, clarinet, string bass, and piano. Text by Dorothy Parker.
 Greenwood Sketches, Music for String Quartet
 A Prophecy, for chorus and piano. Text by Allen Ginsberg.

1977

 Etudes and Portraits, for solo organ

1979

 Northern Lights, two portraits for chamber orchestra
 I. Leós Janacek, for two flutes, four solo violins, timpani, and strings
 II. Edvard Munch, for two flutes, string quartet, timpani, and string orchestra
 A Joyful Fugue, transcription for band of an orchestral score by Virgil Thomson

1981

 Landscapes, Symphony No. III, for chorus and large orchestra
 I. A Prophecy (Allen Ginsberg)
 II. A Night Battle (Walt Whitman)
 III. Moment Fugue 1929 (Hart Crane)
 IV. Landscape (Alberta Phillips)
 Four Fairy Tales After Oscar Wilde, for orchestra
 I. The Young King
 II. The Nightingale and the Rose
 III. The Happy Prince
 A. Prelude
 B. Romance of the Sparrow and Reed
 C. Coda
 IV. The Remarkable Rocket

1982

 Overture to Paul Bunyan, transcription for band of an orchestral score by Benjamin Britten

1983

 Song of Return, for SATB chorus with piano. Text by W. H. Auden.

1985

 Cymbeline, drama after Shakespeare for soprano and tenor soli, narrator, plus chamber ensemble (11 players)

1986

 The Gift, for SATB chorus with soprano solo. Text by William Carlos Williams.
 Three Portraits for Chamber Orchestra
 I. Virgil Thomson (1981)
 Version for solo piano composed in 2015
 II. Maurice Grosser (1983)
 III. Jack Larson (1986)

1988

 Free-fall, for chamber ensemble (seven players)

1989

 A Song of Return, cantata for small chorus and orchestra. Text by W. H. Auden.
 The Gift, for chorus, soprano solo, and orchestra

1990

 Wilde [Symphony No. IV], for baritone and orchestra. Runner-up for the 1991 Pulitzer Prize for Music.

1991

 Goethe Lieder, cycle of five songs with an epilogue
 1. Soprano or tenor and piano
 2. Version for seven players
 3. Version for orchestra
 Last Trombones, for five percussionists, two pianos, and six (or twelve) trombones

1992

 Specimen Days, cantata for baritone solo, chorus, and orchestra. Text by Will Graham, based on the life and writings of Walt Whitman.

1993

 Being Music, for baritone solo and string quartet. Text by Walt Whitman.
 Song and Dance, for violin and piano
 Invocation, for chorus (SA and accompaniment or SATB). Text by May Sarton.

1994

 Sonata-Duo, for flute and piano

1995

 Symphony No. V, for orchestra
 Night Song, for solo piano

1996

 Comrade and The Journey, two songs for baritone and piano

1997

 The Astronaut's Tale, chamber opera. Text by Jack Larson.
 Mists, three pieces for a cappella chorus. Texts by Hart Crane.

1998

 November Leaves, four songs for mezzo-soprano and orchestra. Texts by Alfred Corn.
 Sonnet, for baritone solo, flute, and organ. Text by Elizabeth Bishop.
 Trio, for violin, cello, and piano

1999

 From A Pioneer Songbook, for a cappella chorus
2000

 A Walt Whitman Sampler, for TTBB chorus and piano. Text by Will Graham.
 Venture, four songs for baritone and piano on poems by Toni Mergentime Levi
 Version for baritone and orchestra was composed in 2016
2002

 Right River, Variations on an Original Theme for 'cello and string orchestra

2003

 Infinite Fraternity, for SATB chorus, baritone solo, flute, and viola. Texts by Nathaniel Hawthorne, Herman Melville, and Will Graham.
 High Bridge (rev. 2008), A Choral Symphony [No. VI] after poems of Hart Crane, for soprano, alto, tenor, baritone solos, chorus and orchestra
2008

 Moonshine, for double bass and vibraphone

2011

 Marion in Memory, for flute, clarinet, horn, violin, cello, piano, and marimba

2018

 K.G. in Space and Time, for flute, clarinet, horn, marimba (and vibraphone), piano (and celesta), violin, and cello

References

Living people
American male classical composers
American classical composers
20th-century classical composers
Place of birth missing (living people)
1938 births
20th-century American male musicians